The Lighthouse of Ponta da Barca is a beacon/lighthouse located along the  cliffs of Ponta da Barca, near the hamlet of Bom Jesus, civil parish of Santa Cruz da Graciosa on the island of the same, the Portuguese archipelago of the Azores. Immediately near the lighthouse, is the emblematic baleia de pedra (whale rock), a curious geological basaltic rock that has resisted erosion, in the shape of a whale. It is considered a second-order lighthouse, which began operating on 1 February 1930.

The lighthouse, denoted as 797 (Internationally recognized as D-2676) is equipped with a 3-order lenticular dioptric lamp with a  focal distance, manufactured in 1927. Initially the beacon was produced by a mechanical system that rotated the incandescent lamp every 5 seconds, powered by a diesel engine (and with a butane reserve).

History

Difficulties in accessibility and problems with the geomorphology of the area brought the planners to the conclusion that Ponta da Barca would be a more suitable alternative (although the interposition of Pico Negro did not permit some visibility from Ponta da Barca). The new selection, was acceptable to the Comissão dos Faróis e Balizas (Commission on Lighthouses and Beacons), which concluded in 1902 that although the economically small lighthouse would be able to support ships travelling from the north.

Although included in the 1883 Lighthouse Plan, and its location selected in 1902, it was not until 1927 when the equipment, optics and lantern were purchased from France (for 804,200 francs). Isolated in the northwest coast of Graciosa, a road was constructed in 1935 by the District Government of Angra do Heroísmo to link the lighthouse to Santa Cruz (supported by 6000$00 escudos from Lighthouse Commission).

The original lighthouse building had initially consisted of two living quarters for the lighthouse keepers. After 1952 a third space, and then a fourth were added, in order support four lighthouse keepers. The lighthouse was electrified in 1958, with the mounting of two groups of generators, with the beacon being upgraded to an incandescent 3000 Watts/110 Volt lamp, with a range of : the diesel supported incandescent lamp was placed on reserve. The lighthouse joined the municipal power-grid in 1999, and services became automated through DF model system.

The lighthouse is today the tallest tower in the Azores, in an intemperate zones; in 1978 an intense lightning storm caused large damage in the lighthouse and lighthouse keeper's quarters. The 1 January 1980 earthquake caused damage to the lighthouse with landslides occurring around the clifftop: its beacon continued to function.

References

Notes

Sources

See also

 List of lighthouses in Portugal

Lighthouses completed in 1902
Ponta Barca
Buildings and structures in Santa Cruz da Graciosa